Preston Lacy (born August 14, 1969) is an American stunt performer, actor, comedian and one of the stars of the reality stunt show Jackass.

Career 
Lacy was born on August 14, 1969, in either Sarcoxie or Carthage, Missouri. He worked as a truck driver in Missouri before moving to California. He landed roles in several commercials, including one for Napster that aired during Super Bowl XXXIX. Lacy first met Johnny Knoxville through Knoxville's ex-wife, who ran a clothing company. Lacy was hired to transport textiles for the clothing company. After becoming friends with Knoxville, Lacy began to suggest ideas for the Jackass series to him. Originally brought on as a writer, Knoxville convinced Lacy to participate in the stunts.

Lacy shares a writing credit for National Lampoon's TV: The Movie. He starred alongside Chris Kattan in the film Christmas in Wonderland. He appeared in Jackass: The Movie (2002), Jackass Number Two (2006), Jackass 2.5 (2007), Jackass 3D (2010), Jackass 3.5 (2011), Jackass Forever (2022), and Jackass 4.5 (2022).

Lacy has been on tour doing stand-up comedy. Notably, he has participated in the BBM Comedy Tours in New York and Florida, as well performing at festivals, clubs and bar rooms around the United States.

Jackass 
When on Jackass, Lacy is most often featured with Jason "Wee Man" Acuña and their most common skit involves Lacy chasing after Acuña down public streets in nothing more than their briefs and white tanktops, showing off his obesity. Lacy has contributed many of the ideas that later became Jackass skits and stunts. He is also known for his anger outbursts, the most memorable of which occurred during the "Eggnog Challenge" for the Jackass Christmas Special. In Jackass 2.5 (2007), it was revealed that Lacy has an extreme fear of heights.

Filmography

Television

Films

Web series

Music videos

Video games

References

External links 

Wee Man and Preston Lacy on Tom Green Live

American stunt performers
Jackass (TV series)
Living people
1969 births